Kovardy (Qawarźı) is a rural locality (a selo) and the administrative centre of Kovardinsky Selsoviet, Gafuriysky District, Bashkortostan, Russia. The population was 818 as of 2010. There are 9 streets.

Geography 
Kovardy is located 58 km northeast of Krasnousolsky (the district's administrative centre) by road. Aktashevo is the nearest rural locality.

References 

Rural localities in Gafuriysky District